Kobbie Boateng Mainoo (born 19 April 2005) is an English professional footballer who plays as a midfielder for  Premier League club Manchester United.

Early life
Born in Stockport, Mainoo started his youth career at Cheadle & Gatley Junior Football Club, before joining Manchester United at the age of nine.

Club career
Mainoo signed his first professional contract in May 2022. His performances, including a good midfield display against Carlisle United in the EFL Trophy, earned him a callup to the senior squad for training in October 2022. He was named on the bench for the first time on 16 October 2022, ahead of a Premier League match against Newcastle United. 

Mainoo made his competitive debut for Manchester United on 10 January 2023, starting in a 3–0 EFL Cup win over Charlton Athletic. On 19 February 2023, Mainoo officially made his Premier League debut by coming on as a substitute in a 3–0 victory against Leicester City.

International career
Mainoo has represented England at under-17 and under-18 levels. He is also eligible to represent Ghana.

Career statistics

Club

Honours
Manchester United U18
FA Youth Cup: 2021–22

References

External links
Profile at the Manchester United F.C. website

2005 births
Living people
Association football midfielders
English footballers
English sportspeople of Ghanaian descent
England youth international footballers
Footballers from Stockport
Manchester United F.C. players
Premier League players
Black British sportsmen